Fairfield Center is an unincorporated community in Fairfield Township, DeKalb County, Indiana.

History
A post office was established at Fairfield Center in 1852, and remained in operation until it was discontinued in 1906. Fairfield Center is at the geographical center of Fairfield Township, hence the name.

Geography

References

Unincorporated communities in DeKalb County, Indiana
Unincorporated communities in Indiana